Gods or deities are beings with superhuman powers or qualities who may be thought of as holy, divine, or sacred.

Gods may also refer to:
 Gods (video game), a 1991 video game
 Gods (film), 2014 Polish film directed by Łukasz Palkowski
 The gods (theatrical), the upper levels of a theatre
 The Gods (band), a rock band from England
 The Gods (TV series), a 2018 Chinese series

See also
 
 
 God (disambiguation)
 Goddess (disambiguation)
 List of deities
 Polytheism
 The Godz (disambiguation)